Bamidele Mathew Aiyenugba (born 20 November 1983 in Jos, Nigeria) is a Nigerian footballer with Kwara United F.C. His name, Bamidele, means "Follow me home" in Yoruba language.

After 13 seasons in Israel with four teams, Aiyenugba returned to Nigeria ahead of the 2020-21 season to play for Kwara United.

Honours
Nigerian Premier League: 4
2002, 2003, 2005, 2007

Nigerian FA Cup: 1
2005

Nigerian Super Cup: 1
2003

African Champions League: 2
2003, 2004

African Super Cup: 2
2004, 2005

References

External links
Player profile - Bnei Yehuda website

 

1983 births
Living people
Nigerian footballers
Yoruba sportspeople
Kwara United F.C. players
Bnei Yehuda Tel Aviv F.C. players
Hapoel Ashkelon F.C. players
Hapoel Iksal F.C. players
Hapoel Afula F.C. players
Expatriate footballers in Israel
Nigerian expatriate footballers
Association football goalkeepers
Nigeria international footballers
2006 Africa Cup of Nations players
2008 Africa Cup of Nations players
2010 Africa Cup of Nations players
Enyimba F.C. players
2010 FIFA World Cup players
Israeli Premier League players
Liga Leumit players
Sportspeople from Jos